Stixis is a South-East Asian genus of plants in the order Brassicales; they are typically lianas.  This genus has previously been placed in the Stixaceae (now obsolete) and Capparaceae, but under the APG IV system is now included in the family Resedaceae.

Species
Plants of the World Online (POWO) includes the following accepted species, as of February 2021:

Stixis hookeri 
Stixis nayarii 
Stixis obtusifolia 
Stixis ovata 
Stixis philippinensis 
Stixis scandens 
Stixis scortechinii 
Stixis suaveolens

References

External links 
 

 
Flora of Indo-China
Flora of Malesia
Brassicales genera